Harold Franklin "Hal" Epps (March 26, 1914 – August 25, 2004) was an outfielder for the St. Louis Cardinals, St. Louis Browns, and Philadelphia Athletics.

Although he only spent parts of four seasons in the majors, Epps had an 18-year professional baseball career. He compiled a .300 minor league average and led the Texas League in triples three times (1938, 1938, and 1947).

When his playing days were over, he managed semi-pro teams and then worked for many years for Armco Steel. Epps spent two years in the 25th infantry division, spending time in both the Philippines and Japan. Upon his death he was buried at the Houston National Cemetery.

References

External links
 Baseball Reference
 

1914 births
2004 deaths
Major League Baseball outfielders
St. Louis Browns players
St. Louis Cardinals players
Philadelphia Athletics players
Burials at Houston National Cemetery
Baseball players from Georgia (U.S. state)